Ape Municipality is a former municipality in Vidzeme, Latvia. The municipality was formed in 2009 by merging Gaujiena parish, Vireši parish, Trapene parish and Ape town with its countryside territory, the administrative centre being Ape. In 2010 Ape parish was created from the countryside territory of Ape town.

On 1 July 2021, Ape Municipality ceased to exist and its territory was merged into Smiltene Municipality.

See also 
 Administrative divisions of Latvia

References

External links 
 

 
Former municipalities of Latvia